Tataltepec Chatino, also known as Lowland Chatino and Chatino Occidental Bajo, is an indigenous Mesoamerican language, one of the Chatino family of the Oto-Manguean languages. It is not intelligible with other Chatino languages. It is named after the town of Tataltepec de Valdés, and is also spoken in San Pedro Tututepec.

Status 
Tataltepec de Valdés is divided between Chatinos, only a few of whom know Chatino, and Mestizos, none of whom know Chatino. Spanish is the dominant language of Tataltepec de Valdés, and is the only language used in all domains of public life except for conversations between speakers of Tataltepec Chatino. Unlike in other Chatino-speaking towns, loudspeakers used for public announcements broadcast exclusively in Spanish. Spanish is the only language used for government, but Chatino-speaking officials use the language when no monolingual Spanish-speakers are present. Unlike other Chatino communities, ceremonies welcoming new officials to local government are conducted entirely in Spanish.

Chatino speakers know that their numbers are in decline, but there are some movements towards revitalization. There are signs of nostalgia among all community members for the language, including among the younger generation, and public events feature young Chatinos (typically semi-speakers) who are using the language in various ways. Proficiency in Tataltepec is increasingly no longer being taken for granted, who increasingly view even some knowledge of Tataltepec Chatino as praiseworthy.

Phonology

Vowels 
There are five vowels: /a, e, i, o, u/. All vowels except for /u/ have been nasalized, all vowels can be lengthened, and all vowels that can be nasalized can be both nasalized and lengthened.

Consonants 

All labial consonants occur more rarely than other consonants, and /β̞/ and /f/ occur mainly in nativized loanwords.

References

Sources

External links 
Chatino Indian Language at native-languages.org
OLAC resources in and about the Tataltepec Chatino language

Chatino languages